Pretty Foe (Persian title: Ahriman-e Ziba- )  is a 1962 Iranian Persian-genre romance drama film directed by Esmail Koushan and starring Azar Hekmat Shoar, Ali Azad, Soraya Bakisa (soheila), Rahim Roshanian, Moezzdivan Fekri, Maliheh Nasiri, Akbar Jannati Shirazi and Hossein Mohseni.

References

1962 films
1962 romantic drama films
1960s Persian-language films
Iranian romantic drama films